Abid Mujagić (born 5 August 1993) is a Bosnian professional footballer who plays as a right winger for Bosnian Premier League club Sloboda Tuzla.

Career
After playing for the youth and senior team of FK Radnik Hadžići, Abid, aged 18, moved abroad to FK Teplice, where he joined the youth team. The year before, he was called up for the Bosnia and Herzegovina U-17 team He couldn't get much playing time for the senior team and was sent to two back to back loans in second-tier teams, first a season at FK Baník Most and then half a season at FK Ústí nad Labem. A half-season stint at FK Teplice's third-tier farm team SK Roudnice nad Labem followed., followed by another second-tier loan at FK Kolín, with only three caps for the team.

At the beginning of 2015, Mujagić moved back to Bosnia and Herzegovina and joined second-tier FK Goražde, playing there for a year before moving on to Zvijezda Gradačac. In early 2017, Mujagić moved abroad again, this time to the Croatian Prva HNL team NK Inter Zaprešić. After a short stint in Inter, Mujagić went to Bosnian Premier League club FK Mladost Doboj Kakanj. After a year and a half he left the club.

On 9 January 2019, Mujagić signed a one and a half year contract with HŠK Zrinjski Mostar. He made his debut for the club on 3 March 2019, in a 0–0 draw against FK Radnik Bijeljina. Mujagić left Zrinjski on 13 June 2019.

Shortly after leaving Zrinjski, on 11 July 2019, Mujagić signed a contract with FK Sloboda Tuzla. He made his debut for Sloboda on 21 July 2019, in a 2–1 home league win against FK Radnik Bijeljina. In that same game he also scored an own goal in the 85th minute.

References

External links

1993 births
Living people
People from Goražde
Association football wingers
Bosnia and Herzegovina footballers
Bosnia and Herzegovina youth international footballers
FK Radnik Hadžići players
FK Teplice players
FK Baník Most players
FK Ústí nad Labem players
FK Kolín players
FK Goražde players
NK Zvijezda Gradačac players
NK Inter Zaprešić players
FK Mladost Doboj Kakanj players
HŠK Zrinjski Mostar players
FK Sloboda Tuzla players
Czech First League players
Czech National Football League players
Premier League of Bosnia and Herzegovina players
Croatian Football League players
Bosnia and Herzegovina expatriate footballers
Expatriate footballers in Croatia
Bosnia and Herzegovina expatriate sportspeople in Croatia
Expatriate footballers in the Czech Republic
Bosnia and Herzegovina expatriate sportspeople in the Czech Republic